Mavinagundi Falls is a water fall located in Siddapura Taluk, Uttara Kannada district, Karnataka, India and it fills with water only during monsoon season. The falls is formed by Mavinagundi river.

View Points
Mavinagudi falls is visible from Jog Falls during June - November period and the falls is surrounded by forest filled mountain range.

References

Tourist attractions in Uttara Kannada district
Geography of Uttara Kannada district
Waterfalls of Karnataka